InuYasha is a Japanese media franchise.

InuYasha may also refer to:

 Inuyasha (character), the main character in Inuyasha media

Films 
 Inuyasha the Movie: Affections Touching Across Time
 Inuyasha the Movie: The Castle Beyond the Looking Glass
 Inuyasha the Movie: Swords of an Honorable Ruler
 Inuyasha the Movie: Fire on the Mystic Island

Video games 
 Inuyasha (video game), a 2001 role-playing game developed by Bandai
 Inuyasha: A Feudal Fairy Tale
 Inuyasha: The Secret of the Cursed Mask
 Inuyasha: Feudal Combat
 Inuyasha: Secret of the Divine Jewel
 Inuyasha: Kagome no Sengoku Nikki
 Inuyasha: Fūun Emaki
 Inuyasha: Kagome no Yume Nikki
 Inuyasha: Naraku no Wana! Mayoi no Mori no Shōtaijō